Saldi may refer to:

Places
 Saldi, a village in the Mehsana District, Gujarat, India

People
 Jay Saldi, former professional American footballer

Other
 Surface-assisted laser desorption/ionization